Peace River—Westlock is a federal electoral district in Alberta, Canada, that has been represented in the House of Commons of Canada since 2015.

Peace River—Westlock was created by the 2012 federal electoral boundaries redistribution and was legally defined in the 2013 representation order. It came into effect upon the call of the 42nd Canadian federal election, scheduled for October 19, 2015. It was created out of parts of Peace River, Fort McMurray—Athabasca, Yellowhead, and Westlock—St. Paul.

Conservative Arnold Viersen, a former mechanic, has been the riding's MP since 2015.

Members of Parliament

This riding has elected the following members of the House of Commons of Canada:

Profile 

This riding is a typical conservative stronghold riding. There are several ridings in Alberta that the Conservative Party of Canada realistically expects to win, and this is one of them. However, the northern portion of the riding is less strongly conservative than the rest, with pockets of support for the NDP. Historically, this riding has been always right-leaning, with support beginning toward the old Progressive Conservative Party of Canada, shifting toward the right-populist Reform Party after the time of prime minister Brian Mulroney, and then held by the new Conservative Party of Canada since the unification of the Progressive Conservatives and Canadian Alliance in 2003.

Election results

References

Alberta federal electoral districts
Barrhead, Alberta
Westlock County
Whitecourt